Sasha James is a Guyanese footballer who plays as a defender for the Guyana women's national team.

Club career
James has played for Fruta Conquerors FC in Guyana.

International career
James capped for Guyana at senior level during the 2018 CONCACAF Women's Championship qualification.

See also
List of Guyana women's international footballers

References

External links

Living people
Guyanese women's footballers
Women's association football defenders
Guyana women's international footballers
Year of birth missing (living people)